Markino may refer to:
Markino Buckley, Jamaican athlete
Yoshio Markino, Japanese artist